Amyema nickrentii is an epiphytic, flowering, hemiparasitic plant of the family Loranthaceae native to the Philippines. It was found in coastal forest  in the Aurora Province and "differs from all other described Amyema species in having a whorled leaf arrangement with mostly nine flat linear leaves per node".

Taxonomy
It was first described by Julie Barcelona & Pieter Pelser in 2013. The specific epithet, nickrentii, honours Daniel Lee Nickrent.

References

nickrentii
Parasitic plants
Epiphytes
Taxa named by Julie F. Barcelona
Plants described in 2013
Taxa named by Pieter B. Pelser
Endemic flora of the Philippines